The Cow Branch Formation is a Late Triassic (Carnian to Norian, or Tuvalian in the regional stratigraphy) geologic formation in the eastern United States. Indeterminate fossil ornithischian tracks have been reported from the formation.

Fossil content 
The following fossils have been reported from the formation:

Reptiles

 Mecistotrachelos apeoros
 Tanytrachelos ahynis
 cf. Pariostegus sp.
 Anthophyta indet.

Fish

 Diplurus cf. newarki
 Cionichthys sp.
 Semionotus sp.
 Synorichthys sp.
 Turseodus sp.

Ichnofossils
 Anchisauripus milfordensis

Arachnids
 Argyrarachne solitus

Insects

 Alinka cara
 Architipula youngi
 Brachyrhyphus distortus
 Cascadelcana virginiana
 Crosaphis virginiensis
 Holcoptera solitensis
 Leehermania prorova
 Metarchilimonia krzeminskorum
 M. solita
 Mormolucoides articulatus
 Phyloblatta grimaldii
 Prosechamyia dimedia
 P. trimedia
 Pseudopolycentropodes virginicus
 Triassonepa solensis
 Triassopsychoda olseni
 Triassothrips virginicus
 Veriplecia rugosa
 Virginiptera certa
 V. lativentra
 V. similis
 Yalea argentata
 Y. rectimedia
 Archescytinidae indet.
 Blattodea indet.
 Diptera indet.
 Naucoridae indet.
 Orthoptera indet.
 Phoroschizidae indet.
 Thysanoptera indet.
 Tipulomorpha indet.

Flora

 Lonchopteris virginiensis
 Pagiophyllum diffusum
 P. simpsoniae
 Zamites powellii
 cf. Acrostichites linnaeafolius
 cf. Compsostrobus neotericus
 Glyptolepis cf. platysperma
 Neocalamites cf. knowltonii
 cf. Zamiostrobus lissocardus
 Dictyophyllum sp.
 Glandulozamites sp.
 Lepacyclotes sp.
 Lepidodendron sp.
 Pagiophyllum sp.
 Pelourdea sp.
 Podozamites sp.
 Pterophyllum sp.
 Sphenozamites sp.
 Wingatea sp.
 cf. Dechellyia sp.
 cf. Elatocladus sp.
 cf. Grammaephloios sp.
 cf. Sagenopteris sp.

See also 

 List of dinosaur-bearing rock formations
 List of stratigraphic units with ornithischian tracks
 Indeterminate ornithischian tracks

References

Bibliography 

 
 
 
 
  
 
 
 
 

Geologic formations of North Carolina
Geologic formations of Virginia
Triassic System of North America
Triassic geology of North Carolina
Triassic geology of Virginia
Carnian Stage
Norian Stage
Shale formations of the United States
Siltstone formations
Lacustrine deposits
Ichnofossiliferous formations
Paleontology in North Carolina
Paleontology in Virginia